Leech is an English surname, originally denoting a physician (in reference to the medical practice of bloodletting). 
Notable people with the surname include:

 Allen Leech (born 1981), Irish stage, television and film actor
 Andrew Leech (born 1952), English cricketer
 Faith Leech (1941–2013), Australian freestyle swimmer
 Fred Leech (1923–2001), English footballer
 Geoffrey Leech (1936–2014), specialist in English language and linguistics
 George L. Leech (1890–1985), American prelate of the Roman Catholic Church
 George Leech (actor) (1921–2012), British actor and stunt performer
 Gwyneth Leech, American artist
 Haliburton Hume Leech (1908–1939), Royal Air Force aviator, air racer and test pilot
 James Russell Leech (1888–1952), Republican member of the U.S. House of Representatives from Pennsylvania

 Kenneth Leech (born 1939), Anglican priest and Christian socialist
 Noyes Leech (1921–2010), American law professor at the University of Pennsylvania Law School
 Margaret Leech (1893–1974), American historian and fiction writer
 Michelle Leech, Australian academic clinician-scientist and rheumatologist
 Richard Leech (1922–2004), Irish actor
 Richard Leech (tenor) (born 1957), American operatic tenor
 Ryan Leech (born 1979), Canadian trials mountain bike rider
 Samuel Leech (1798–1848), sailor in the Royal Navy and the United States Navy during the War of 1812
 William John Leech (1881–1968), Irish painter

Occupational surnames

Surnames
English-language surnames
English-language occupational surnames